Helgeland Sparebank is a Norwegian savings bank, headquartered in Mosjøen, Norway. The banks main market is the Helgeland district of northern Norway. The bank was established in 1977 with the merger of Vefsn Sparebank, Herøy Sparebank, Brønnøysund Sparebank, Velfjord Sparebank and Vevelstad Sparebank.

External links
 Official Website

References

Banks of Norway
Companies based in Nordland
Banks established in 1977
Companies listed on the Oslo Stock Exchange